Doyle Vermette is a Canadian politician. He is a member of the Legislative Assembly of Saskatchewan, representing the electoral district of Cumberland as a member of the New Democratic Party. He was first elected in a 2008 by-election, and was most recently re-elected in the 2020 general election.

Political career
Vermette won a nomination race over two other candidates to run for the NDP in the Cumberland  provincial electoral district by-election held on June 25, 2008, following the resignation of Joan Beatty from the legislature. He won the electoral district in the by-election defeating two other candidates. On election night, the results see-sawed back and forth between Vermette and Saskatchewan Party candidate Dale McAuley, with Vermette ultimately being elected with a majority of 164.

Vermette is the Opposition Whip in the Legislature, and serves in various portfolios within the provincial shadow cabinet.

Electoral record

2020 Saskatchewan general election

2016 Saskatchewan general election

2011 Saskatchewan general election

2008 Cumberland by-election

References

Living people
Métis politicians
Politicians from Prince Albert, Saskatchewan
Saskatchewan New Democratic Party MLAs
21st-century Canadian politicians
Year of birth missing (living people)
Canadian Métis people